Mevaram, is a neighbourhood and a junction in the city of Kollam in the Indian state of Kerala. The Kollam Bypass, which forms part of National Highway-66, begins from Mevaram junction. Mevaram is located at the borders of Kollam Municipal Corporation. It is the southern tip of Kollam City.

Mevaram-Emerging healthcare hub of Kollam
Mevaram is now a hot spot of Kollam city due to the presence of high number of super-speciality hospitals. Travancore Medicity Medical College, Meditrina Hospital (Kollam's tertiary care hospital), N. S. Memorial Institute of Medical Sciences (South Kerala's largest co-operative hospital), N.S Ayurveda Hospital, Ashtamudi Hospital & Trauma Care Centre (an initiative from a group of doctors) are hospitals in the Mevaram-Ayathil stretch.

Institutions and hospitals near Mevaram

 Travancore Medical College Hospital, Kollam
 N. S. Memorial Institute of Medical Sciences
 N.S. Ayurveda Hospital
 Meditrina Hospital, Ayathil
 Ashtamudi Hospital
 Sarathy true value
 Muthoot Tata
 AMW
 BeMax Academy
 Vadakkevila Co-operative Bank Mevaram Branch 
 Lalas Convention Center
 Grand Auditorium

Nearby towns
 Kottiyam
 Kollam

See also 
 Chinnakada
 Kollam Junction railway station

References

Neighbourhoods in Kollam